State Route 31 (SR 31) is a  north-south state highway in northeastern Tennessee. The highway runs from U.S. Route 11W in Mooresburg north to SR 66 in Sneedville.

Route description
SR 31 begins at a junction with US 11W/SR 1 in Mooresburg. The highway heads north into rural Hawkins County, passing through the community of Spruce Pine. While crossing over Clinch Mountain, the route crosses into Hancock County. Past the mountain ridge, the highway intersects SR 131 in Treadway and briefly becomes a four-laned undivided Highway and continues northward through Luther and Duck Creek before turning northeast along the Clinch River. The route then enters Sneedville, where it terminates at SR 66, which connects to SR 33 and Sneedville via a bridge.

The entire route of SR 31 is a narrow rural 2-lane mountain highway.

Junction list

References

031
Transportation in Hawkins County, Tennessee
Transportation in Hancock County, Tennessee